Earl Daniel Desmond (August 26, 1895 – May 26, 1958) was a United States Democratic politician.

Desmond was born in Sacramento, California, and during World War I he served in the United States Army.  He subsequently became a member of the California legislature for the 19th District and in 1941 was Speaker pro Tem of the California State Assembly.

Desmond is chiefly remembered for his efforts in relation to the establishment of California State University, Sacramento, in 1947.  Desmond convinced the Senate's finance committee to withhold funding for the University of California until he had a commitment. Eleven of his own children and grandchildren graduated from the university, which, in recognition of his contribution, named one of its halls of residence after him.

Earl D. Desmond died in office at Sacramento, aged 62.  His son, Louis N. Desmond (1926-2012), later served as Deputy District Attorney, Sacramento County.

References

United States Army personnel of World War I
1895 births
1958 deaths
20th-century American politicians
Democratic Party members of the California State Assembly
Democratic Party California state senators